Stave Run is a stream in Fairfax County, Virginia, in the United States. It was formerly called Whiskey Barrel Run.

Stave Run was so named on account of staves for barrels being made nearby.

See also
List of rivers of Virginia

References

Rivers of Fairfax County, Virginia
Rivers of Virginia